White Eagle, Red Star: The Polish–Soviet War, 1919–20 is a 1972 book by Norman Davies covering the Polish–Soviet War. The monograph is Davies's first book.

It is considered by many historians to be one of the best English-language books on the subject. A. J. P. Taylor, who wrote its foreword, also wrote: "Norman Davies's book is a permanent contribution to historical knowledge and international understanding."

Editions
The book had several editions and translations:

ISBNs:
 For Pimlico; new edition (27 Nov 2003)
 
 

 For Orbis Books (London) Ltd; revised edition (Jan 1984)
 
 

 For Birlinn Ltd (30 Nov 2000)
 
 

 For Macdonald (13 Jul 1972)
 
 

Other language editions:
 Polish bibuła underground translations – two in 1987 and 1988
 .

Further reading
 .
 .

References

External links
White Eagle, Red Star at Norman Davies homepage

1972 non-fiction books
Polish–Soviet War
Books by Norman Davies
History books about Poland
Books about the Soviet Union
History books about the Soviet Union
Books about military history
20th-century history books